Pope Benedict XVI created 90 cardinals in five consistories. With three of those consistories he respected the limit on the number of cardinal electors set at 120 in 1973, though sometimes exceeded by his predecessors. He exceeded that limit at the other two consistories, reaching as high as 125 in 2012.

With the consistory of February 2012, a majority of the cardinal electors had been named cardinals by him, 63 of 125. After his last consistory in November 2012, he had appointed 67 of the 120 electors.

Cardinal electors

Benedict's first, second and last consistories brought the number of cardinal electors to 120.

The 2010 consistory produced 121 electors, until Cardinal Bernard Panafieu turned 80 two months later on 26 January 2011. After the consistory of February 2012, there were 125 electors, and the count returned to 120 on 26 July after the 80th birthdays of Cardinals Rodolfo Quezada Toruño, Edward Michael Egan, Miloslav Vlk, Henri Schwery, and James Francis Stafford.

24 March 2006

Pope Benedict XVI created new cardinals for the first time on 24 March 2006. He announced the names of fifteen new cardinals from eleven different countries on 22 February. Three belonged to the Roman Curia, nine headed a diocese, and two were bishops emeritus. One, Albert Vanhoye, was a Jesuit priest and theologian, not a bishop. Twelve of the fifteen were under 80 years old and eligible to vote in a papal conclave. With these new cardinals, Benedict limited the number of cardinal electors to 120, the maximum set by statute since 1973 and which John Paul II had at times exceeded. The appointments brought the total number of cardinals to 193.

24 November 2007

Pope Benedict announced the appointment of 23 new cardinals on 17 October 2007, scheduling a consistory for 24 November. Eighteen of the 23 cardinals were under 80. After the consistory, the College of Cardinals had 201 members, of whom 120 were eligible to vote in a papal election.

He announced that he had intended to make Bishop Ignacy Jeż of Koszalin-Kołobrzeg, Poland, who died on 16 October, a cardinal as well.

20 November 2010

Benedict announced the names of 24 new cardinals on 10 October 2010, scheduling a consistory for 20 November. Fifteen were Europeans, including ten Italians, seven of whom were senior members of the Roman Curia. Twenty were under 80 years old. This consistory brought the number of cardinals to 203, of whom 121 were eligible to vote in a conclave.

18 February 2012

Benedict announced the names of 22 new cardinals on 6 January 2012, with a consistory set for 18 February. Eighteen were young enough to be cardinal electors. Sixteen were Europeans, including seven Italians. Ten held Vatican offices. With these additions, the number of cardinal electors increased from 107 to 125, a majority of 63 of them named by Benedict. Though the number of cardinal electors exceeded the limit of 120, nine of them were due to turn eighty before the end of the year. Previously, only Pope John Paul II's consistories in 2001 and 2003 had produced a larger number of electors, 135. The consistory of February 2012 brought the total number of cardinals to 213.

24 November 2012

On 24 October 2012, during a meeting of the Synod of Bishops, Benedict announced he would create six cardinals at a consistory on 24 November. At the time, there were 116 cardinal electors, with two set to turn 80 in the next month. The six new cardinals would bring that number to 120, 67 of whom were made cardinals by Benedict. The November consistory brought the total number of cardinals to 211. Those named contrasted with those of the previous consistory, who had been criticized as "too Italian and too curial". Benedict said that "this little consistory" was meant to "complete" the earlier one "with a sign of the universality of the Church".

See also

 List of current cardinals

Notes

References

Benedict XVI
Pope Benedict XVI
College of Cardinals
Lists of 21st-century people
21st-century Catholicism